A door tenant is a barrister who has been granted permission to join a set of chambers and work with them from premises outside the chambers themselves. Those members who work on the premises are simply 'tenants' while 'squatters' are those who make legitimate use of the premises without belonging to the set.

References

Practice of law